Bill Pierce may refer to:

Entertainment
 Billy Pierce (choreographer) (1890–1933), African American choreographer and dancer
 Billie Pierce (1907–1974), jazz pianist
 Bill Pierce (photographer) (born 1935), American photographer and journalist
 Bill Pierce (saxophonist) (born 1948), American jazz saxophonist

Sports
 Bill Pierce (American football) (1909–1981), American college football player and coach
 Bill Pierce (baseball) (1890–1962), player and manager in the Negro leagues
 Billy Pierce (1927–2015), baseball pitcher

See also
 Bill Pearce (1926–2010), singer, trombonist, and radio broadcaster
 Bill Peirce (born 1938), Ohio gubernatorial candidate
 Pierce (surname)
 William Pierce (disambiguation)